The 1998 Generali Open was a men's tennis tournament played on outdoor clay courts in Kitzbühel, Austria that was part of the International Series of the 1998 ATP Tour. It was the 43rd edition of the tournament and was held from 27 July until 2 August 1998. Second-seeded Albert Costa won the singles title.

Finals

Singles

 Albert Costa defeated  Andrea Gaudenzi, 6–2, 1–6, 6–2, 3–6, 6–1
 It was Costa's 2nd singles title of the year and the 8th of his career.

Doubles

 Tom Kempers /  Daniel Orsanic defeated  Joshua Eagle /  Andrew Kratzmann, 6–3, 6–4

References

External links
 ITF tournament edition details

Generali Open
Austrian Open Kitzbühel
Austrian Open